Nuntiella is a genus of moths belonging to the subfamily Olethreutinae of the family Tortricidae.

Species
Nuntiella angustiptera Zhang & Li, 2004
Nuntiella extenuata Kuznetzov, 1971
Nuntiella lacticulla Zhang & Li, 2004

See also
List of Tortricidae genera

References

External links

tortricidae.com

Eucosmini
Tortricidae genera